P. L. Kapitza Institute for Physical Problems of the Russian Academy of Sciences. The institute was founded in 1934. The founder of the institute, Nobel laurate Pyotr Kapitsa served as its head for many years. The head of the theoretical division of the institute was Lev Landau. The primary direction of research at the institute is low temperature physics, such as superconductivity and superfluidity. The theoretical division later became Landau Institute for Theoretical Physics.

Notes

External links
Institute web site

Nuclear research institutes in Russia
Physics institutes
Research institutes in the Soviet Union
Nuclear technology in the Soviet Union
1934 establishments in the Soviet Union
Research institutes established in 1934
Cultural heritage monuments of regional significance in Moscow